Damjan Štrbac (19 February 1912 - 17 July 1941) was a Serbian Orthodox Church priest. He was canonized as Saint Damian Grahovski.

Biography 

Štrbac was born in Plavno near Knin.
He finished seminary in Cetinje in 1932. He was ordained a deacon on March 17 and a priest on March 18, 1934 in Šibenik.

He served in Žegar and then in Bosansko Grahovo when the World War II started.

At the end of May 1941, the fascist italy army withdrew from Grahovo and its surroundings, and was replaced by an Ustaše unit, who immediately proceeded on 14 June 1941 to arrest citizens from the place and the surrounding area. Among them, the priest Damjan was arrested. He spent almost twenty days in the prison of the District Court in Bosansko Grahovo, and after that he was taken to Knin, and then to Gospić, where he was held as a detainee no. 577. He was taken from the camp to the Jadovno concentration camp and killed there, that is, he was skinned alive by the Ustashas and then thrown into a pit.

At the regular session Holy Council of Bishops of the Serbian Orthodox Church, 20 in May 2003, at the suggestion of Bishop Chrysostom of Bihać-Petrovac, he was included in the Council of Saints priest-martyr of the Church of God.

His memorial is celebrated on 31 May.

Reference 

{
Serbian saints of the Eastern Orthodox Church
1941 deaths
20th-century Eastern Orthodox martyrs
New Martyrs
People executed by the Independent State of Croatia
People murdered in the Independent State of Croatia
Yugoslav people who died in the Holocaust
Serbian people who died in the Holocaust
Deaths by blade weapons
People who died in Jadovno concentration camp
1912 births